Educating Cardiff is the fourth series of the British documentary television programme Educating broadcast on Channel 4. The eight-episode series was broadcast from 25 August 2015 to 13 October 2015. The documentary follows previous instalments in the Educating... series including the BAFTA Award-winning Educating Essex (2011), Educating Yorkshire (2013) and Educating the East End (2014). Filmed at Willows High School in Cardiff, Wales, it captures every detail of life in a modern school. Educating Cardiff follows Head Teacher Joy Ballard and her team of teachers and support staff in their mission to turn the school around, transforming it from one of the worst performing schools in Cardiff into a school to be proud of.

Episodes

Production
The follow-up to Educating the East End was announced by Channel 4 on 9 December 2014. Producers had looked to schools in Scotland, Northern Ireland and Wales for the new series before settling on Willows High School in Cardiff. Executive producer David Clews revealed "you can really feel the charm and character of the place as soon as you walk through the gates and start talking to the students". Joy Ballard initially declined TwoFour's invitation before changing her mind a month later. In preparation for the programme she took advice from Jonny Mitchell, head of Thornhill Community Academy in Educating Yorkshire. The first six weeks of production saw the documentary makers observing the school and "picking up stories". Filming began in October and lasted until Christmas.

References

External links
 Educating Cardiff at Channel 4
 

2010s British documentary television series
2015 British television seasons
Channel 4 documentary series
English-language television shows
British high school television series
Television series about educators
Television series about teenagers
Television shows set in Cardiff